Earle Courtenay Rattray (born October 21, 1959) is a Jamaican  diplomat who has been serving as the United Nations High Representative for the Least Developed Countries, Landlocked Developing Countries and Small Island Developing States since 2021.

Early life and education
Rattray holds a Master of Arts degree from the Fletcher School of Law and Diplomacy at Tufts University, a Master of Arts in International Business from the London South Bank University and a Bachelor of Arts in International Studies from West Virginia Wesleyan College. He was awarded a Doctor of Humane Letters (Honoris Causa) by West Virginia Wesleyan College.

Early career
Before he joined the foreign service, Rattray served as Executive Director of the Jamaica Marketing Company in London (1990–1997) and Director of Marketing and Promotions at the Jamaica National Export Corporation in Kingston (1987–1988).

Career in the diplomatic service
From 2001 to 2005 he was Deputy Chief of Jamaica's Embassy in Washington, D.C.
From 2005 to 2008 he was Director of the Bilateral Relations Department in the Ministry of Industry and Investment, in Kingston.
From 2008 to April 25, 2013 he was ambassador in Beijing.

From 2013 until 2021, Rattray served as Jamaica's Permanent Representative to the Headquarters of the United Nations. In this capacity, he chaired the United Nations General Assembly First Committee. In December 2021, he was appointed Chef de Cabinet to the UN Secretary General António Guterres.

References

1959 births
Living people
Ambassadors of Jamaica to China
Permanent Representatives of Jamaica to the United Nations